Shelby Lynne is the sixteenth album by American singer Shelby Lynne. It was released in 2020 via Everso Records. Three singles were released from it: "I Got You", "Here I Am" and "Don't Even Believe in Love".

Track listing
"Strange Things" – 3:34
"I Got You" – 4:24
"Love Is Coming" – 4:30
"Weather" – 4:43
"Revolving Broken Heart" – 4:12
"Off My Mind" – 4:44
"Don't Even Believe in Love" – 4:40
"My Mind's Riot" – 3:41
"Here I Am" – 4:07
"The Equation" – 6:46
"Lovefear" – 1:42

References

2020 albums
Shelby Lynne albums